Murray Clarke is a Professor of Philosophy at Concordia University in Montreal, Quebec, Canada specializing in Cognitive Science, Philosophy of Mind, and Naturalized Epistemology. He is the author of Reconstructing Reason and Representation.

Publications 
"Reconstructing Reason and Representation" (2004) MIT Press 
Honorable Mention, 2005, for the American Psychological Association's   William James Prize 
review symposium (Philosophiques, 34:2 (2007) 353-492)

See also
List of people from Montreal

References

External links 
Murray Clarke's website at Concordia University

Canadian philosophers
Academic staff of Concordia University
Living people
Year of birth missing (living people)